In the Grand  European Jury Wine Tasting of 1997, the Grand Jury Européen, consisting entirely of European judges, conducted a  blind tasting of 27 Chardonnay wines from seven countries. Held in Bordeaux, 70 percent of the entries in the wine competition were from France (Burgundy).  All other countries were represented with one entry each, except for Australia, which had two.

The French wine entries were "a regular Hall of White Burgundy Fame. They had such great vineyards and outstanding producers as Meursault Charmes from Domaine Comtes Lafon and Meursault Perrières from Domaine Coche-Dury." In addition, "Various hyphenated grand cru Montrachets showed up: two Chevalier-Montrachets, one from Bouchard Père et Fils, the other from Maison Louis Jadot. Other grands crus included a Bienvenues-Bâtard-Montrachet from Olivier Leflaive and two Corton-Charlemagnes (Louis Latour and Domaine Bonneau du Martray). Two Montrachets were present as well, from Marquis de Laguiche (Joseph Drouhin) and Domaine Jacques Prieur" (Kramer, p. 110).

In addition, there was Puligny-Montrachet Les Combettes from Domaine Sauzet, Puligny-Montrachet Les Pucelles Domaine Leflaive, and Chablis Grand Cru Valmur from that district's most acclaimed producer, Domaine Francois Raveneau.

The judges tasted three vintages of each wine, a 1989, a 1992 and a 1994. At the end of the evaluation, the judges declared the top wine to be Robert Mondavi Chardonnay Reserve, a California wine. Rank number two was won by Domaine Comtes Lafon's Meursault Charmes.
The organizer told Matt Kramer, who wrote an article about the event in Wine Spectator, that he had later "put on the exact same tasting, with the exact same wines, in New York using American tasters. The results were almost identical" (Kramer, p. 111).

See also
Wine competitions
Globalization of wine
Vertical and horizontal wine tasting

References

Further reading
Kramer, Matt. Making Sense of Wine. Philadelphia  & London: Running Press, 2003.

Wine tasting
Wine-related events